Stenjevec is one of the districts of Zagreb, Croatia. It is located in the western part of the city and has 61 000 inhabitants (as of 2011).

List of neighborhoods in Stenjevec
 Jankomir
 Malešnica
 "Matija Gubec"
 Stenjevec
 Špansko
 Vrapče-jug
 Šestine

References

Districts of Zagreb